Dr. Yeoh Eng Kiong OBE, GBS, JP (born 16 April 1946) was the Secretary for Health and Welfare between 1999 and 2002, Secretary for Health, Welfare and Food and a member of the Executive Council between 2002 and 2004 in the Hong Kong Government.

Yeoh's father was the late Yeoh Chin Hin, a Malaysian businessman who was a founder and director of Kuala Lumpur Kepong Berhad.

Career
Yeoh studied medicine at Faculty of Medicine, the University of Hong Kong where he was elected President of the Student Union in 1969 and graduated in 1971. He specialised in gastroenterology. In 1979, he became a consultant physician at Queen Elizabeth Hospital.

After a 19-year career at Hong Kong government hospitals, with recognised work in AIDS research, Yeoh became the first Chief Executive of the newly formed Hospital Authority in 1990. In January 1999, he was appointed to the post of Secretary for Health and Welfare (a civil servant position). In 2002, he was appointed as the Secretary for Health, Welfare and Food under the new political appointee system.

Yeoh is currently a professor at The Jockey Club School of Public Health and Primary Care at the Chinese University of Hong Kong.

SARS
Yeoh was heavily criticised by the media subsequently for his handling of the SARS outbreak in 2003. On 14 March 2003, despite the rising number of SARS cases in Hong Kong, Yeoh insisted there were no signs of a widespread outbreak of pneumonia - this was seen as misleading the public into not taking enough health care precautions. At a hearing at a LegCo select committee, he later explained that he had intended to distinguish the then unnamed disease from other forms of community-acquired pneumonia and to correct the Chinese-language media who had equated "atypical pneumonia" with SARS synonymously before the WHO officially named it. He apologised for the misunderstanding in his communications. He later admitted that he and the government had underestimated the severity of the pandemic and acted passively.

He was forced to resign on 8 July 2004 to take political responsibility over the SARS outbreak. Yeoh was succeeded by Dr. York Chow.

Awards
In 2005, Yeoh was awarded a Gold Bauhinia Star and an Honorary Fellowship by the University of Hong Kong.

References

The Jockey Club School of Public Health and Primary Care, The Chinese University of Hong Kong - Professor Eng-kiong YEOH 

1946 births
Living people
Government officials of Hong Kong
Hong Kong medical doctors
Alumni of the University of Hong Kong
Malaysian emigrants to Hong Kong
Members of the Executive Council of Hong Kong
Malaysian people of Hokkien descent
Malaysian people of Chinese descent
People with acquired permanent residency of Hong Kong
People from Ipoh
People from Perak